Anastasia is a musical play with music and lyrics by Lynn Ahrens and Stephen Flaherty, and a book by Terrence McNally. Based on the 1997 animated film of the same name, the musical adapts the legend of Grand Duchess Anastasia Nikolaevna of Russia, who could have escaped the execution of her family. Years later, an amnesiac orphan named Anya hopes to find some trace of her family by siding with two con men who wish to take advantage of her likeness to the Grand Duchess.

After completing a pre-Broadway run in Hartford, Connecticut, the show premiered on Broadway at the Broadhurst Theatre in April 2017, and since then it has spawned multiple productions worldwide.

Background
A reading was held in 2012, featuring Kelli Barret as Anya (Anastasia), Aaron Tveit as Dmitry, Patrick Page as Vladimir, and Angela Lansbury as the Empress Maria. A workshop was held on June 12, 2015, in New York City, and included Elena Shaddow as Anya, Ramin Karimloo as Gleb Vaganov, a new role, and Douglas Sills as Vlad.

The original stage production of Anastasia premiered at the Hartford Stage in Hartford, Connecticut for previews on May 13, 2016. The show was directed by Darko Tresnjak and choreography by Peggy Hickey, with Christy Altomare and Derek Klena starring as Anya and Dmitry, respectively.

Director Tresnjak explained: "We've kept, I think, six songs from the movie, but there are 16 new numbers. We've kept the best parts of the animated movie, but it really is a new musical". The musical also adds characters not in the film. Additionally, Act 1 is set in Russia and Act 2 in Paris, "which was everything modern Soviet Russia was not: free, expressive, creative, no barriers", according to McNally.

The musical also omits the supernatural elements from the original film, including the character of Rasputin and his musical number "In the Dark of the Night", and introduces instead a new villain called Gleb, a general for the Bolsheviks who receives orders to kill Anya.

Productions

Broadway
The musical opened on Broadway at the Broadhurst Theatre on March 23, 2017, in previews, later officially on April 24, featuring most of the original Hartford principal cast.

The production was met with mixed reviews by critics, citing uneven subplots and an overly long running time as primary issues. The show closed on March 31, 2019 after 808 regular and 34 preview performances.

Madrid

The first European staging opened on October 3, 2018 (officially on October 10) at the Coliseum Theatre in Madrid, Spain, starring Jana Gómez as Anya, Íñigo Etayo as Dmitry, Carlos Salgado as Gleb, Javier Navares as Vlad, Silvia Luchetti as Countess Lily, and Angels Jiménez as Dowager Empress.

The production played 556 performances, ending on March 7, 2020, when performances were suspended due to the COVID-19 pandemic. The same year on September 28, Stage Entertainment announced that Anastasia would not reopen in Madrid following the pandemic.

North America tours
The first North America tour began on October 9, 2018 (officially on October 12) at the Proctor's Theatre in Schenectady, New York, with Lila Coogan as Anya, Stephen Brower as Dmitry, Jason Michael Evans as Gleb, Edward Staudenmayer as Vlad, Tari Kelly as Countess Lily, and Joy Franz as Dowager Empress, and closed on March 12, 2020 at the Walton Arts Center in Fayetteville, when performances were suspended due to the COVID-19 pandemic.

A non-equity North America tour kicked off on October 15, 2021 at the Columbia County Performing Arts Center in Evans, Georgia, starring Kyla Stone as Anya, Sam McLellan as Dmitry, Brandon Delgado as Gleb, Bryan Seastrom as Vlad, Madeline Raube as Countess Lily, Gerri Weagraff as Dowager Empress and Taya Diggs and Marley Sophia as Little Anastasia.

Stuttgart
A German production ran from November 15, 2018 to October 13, 2019 at the Stage Palladium Theater in Stuttgart, starring Judith Caspari as Anya and Milan van Waardenburg as Dmitry (later replaced by Thomas Hohler).

The Hague
A Dutch production officially opened on September 22, 2019 at the AFAS Circustheater in The Hague, The Netherlands. Tessa Sunniva van Tol plays the role of Anya with Milan van Waardenburg as Dmitry transferring from the German production to the Dutch production, which made him the first actor to play the role of Dmitry in two different countries and languages. Other principal roles are being played by René van Kooten, Gerrie van der Klei, Ellen Evers and Ad Knippels.

From March 23, 2020 onwards performances were suspended due to the COVID-19 pandemic. Stage Entertainment announced in April 2021 that Anastasia would not reopen in the Hague following the pandemic.

Japan 
A Japanese production was expected to premiere on March 1, 2020 at the Theatre Orb in Tokyo, but the opening was delayed to March 9 due to the COVID-19 pandemic. The cast was led by Wakana Aoi and Haruka Kinoshita as Anya, Naoto Kaiho, Hiroki Aiba and Akiyoshi Utsumi as Dmitry, Koji Yamamoto, Yoshikuni Dochin (from CHEMISTRY) and Yusuke Tohyama as Gleb, Kenya Osumi and Zen Ishikawa as Vlad, Hikaru Asami, Marcia and Keiko Horiuchi as Countess Lily and Rei Asami as Dowager Empress. The production took its final bow on March 27, having played 14 performances. An Osaka engagement was expected to follow at the Umeda Arts Theater from April 6 to 18 in the same year, but was canceled because of the pandemic.

Additionally, the all-female Takarazuka Revue staged Anastasia in Takarazuka and Tokyo during the summer of 2020. This version included the new song "She Walks In", written by the original creative team for the character of Dmitry and played by Cosmos Troupe top star Suzuho Makaze.

Tampere 
A Finnish production, which was notable for not being a replica of the original Broadway staging, premiered on September 2, 2022 at the Tampere Theatre, Finland, with Pia Piltz as Anya, Petrus Kähkönen as Dmitry, Joel Mäkinen as Gleb, Ville Majamaa as Vlad, Kaisa Hela as Countess Lily, and Sinikka Sokka as Dowager Empress.

Linz 
Another non-replica production opened on September 10, 2022 at the Landestheater in Linz, Austria, starring Hanna Kastner as Anya, Lukas Sandmann as Dmitry, Nikolaj Alexander Brucker as Gleb, Karsten Kenzel as Vlad, Judith Jandl as Countess Lily, and Daniela Dett as Dowager Empress.

São Paulo 
A Portuguese-language production premiered on November 9, 2022 at the Renault Theatre in São Paulo, produced by T4F and Caradiboi. The cast is led by Giovanna Rangel as Anya, Rodrigo Filgueiras as Dmitry, Luciano Andrey as Gleb, Tiago Abravanel as Vlad, Carol Costa as Countess Lily and Edna d'Oliveira as Dowager Empress.

Mexico City 
A Mexican production is expected to open in 2023 at the Teatro Telcel in Mexico City, produced by OCESA Teatro.

Plot

Prologue
In 1906 St. Petersburg, Russia, the Dowager Empress Maria Feodorovna comforts her youngest granddaughter, five-year-old Grand Duchess Anastasia, who is saddened by the fact that her grandmother is moving to Paris, France. Before leaving, the Dowager Empress gives Anastasia a music box as a parting gift ("Prologue: Once Upon a December"). Eleven years later, Anastasia is attending a ball with her family when the Bolsheviks invade the palace. As the Romanovs attempt to escape, Anastasia tries to retrieve her music box, only to be shot at and captured, along with the rest of her family ("The Last Dance of the Romanovs"). The Dowager Empress later receives word in Paris that the entire family has been executed.

Act I
In 1927, Gleb Vaganov, a general for the Bolsheviks who now control Russia, announces to the gloomy Russians that the now-poor Saint Petersburg has been renamed Leningrad, and he promises a bright and peaceful future. The Russians protest this change, but are uplifted by a rumor that Anastasia may have survived the Bolsheviks' attack. Two wanted con men, the handsome young Dmitry and an ex-member of the Imperial Court named Vlad Popov, hear the rumors and brainstorm "the biggest con in history": they will groom a naive girl to become Anastasia in order to extract money from the Dowager Empress ("A Rumor in St. Petersburg").

Dmitry and Vlad hold unsuccessful auditions for the scheme at the theater in the abandoned Yusupov Palace. Just as they are about to give up hope of finding a suitable impostor, a street sweeper named Anya walks in to ask Dmitry about paperwork to get tickets for Paris. Dmitry and Vlad become fascinated as Anya explains that she doesn't remember who she is due to her amnesia and has very few memories of her past ("In My Dreams"). Amazed by her memory loss and resemblance to Anastasia, they select Anya as their impostor.

At the capital, government workers sort through rumors and reports for any that require further action. Three bitter actresses report Anya, Dmitry, and Vlad's plot to Gleb, but he dismisses them and files a case for Anya ("The Rumors Never End"). Back at the palace, Vlad and Dmitry groom a feisty Anya to become Anastasia through history, dining, and dancing lessons ("Learn to Do It").

Gleb orders Anya's arrest, and she is brought to his office in the Nevsky Prospect. The general interrogates the girl and warns her about the consequences of pretending to be Anastasia. He tries to convince her that Anastasia is really dead. He reveals that his father was one of the soldiers who shot the Romanovs and, as a boy, Gleb heard the gunshots and the family's screams. However, Gleb notices that Anya has the "Romanov eyes" and realizes that Anya could indeed be Anastasia. As he harbors feelings for her, he lets her off with a warning ("The Neva Flows").

Anya reunites with Dmitry and they are teased and attacked by his old con partners, whom they must fight off ("The Neva Flows Reprise"). Impressed by Anya's fighting skills, Dmitry opens up to her for the first time and tells her about his childhood in the streets of St. Petersburg and how he had to take care of himself as an orphan ("My Petersburg"). Dmitry begins to trust her enough to show her a music box that he's failed to open, unaware it is the memento that was given to Anastasia by the Dowager Empress. Anya easily winds and opens the box and begins to vaguely remember her past, including an imperial ball many years earlier ("Once Upon a December"). After this episode, Anya is more resolute than ever in her desire to get to Paris, but Dmitry tells her that they don't have enough money to buy the train tickets. Then she gives him her most prized possession, a diamond that was found sewn to her dress when she was discovered years earlier ("A Secret She Kept").

At the train station, Count Ipolitov recognizes Anya as Anastasia and kisses her hand. As they board the train to Paris, Count Ipolitov leads everyone in a prayer of farewell to Russia ("Stay, I Pray You"). During the train ride, Anya, Dmitry, and Vlad reflect on what they hope to accomplish in Paris: Anya hoping to discover that she is actually Anastasia, Dmitry's desire for the money, and Vlad hoping to win back Countess Lily Malevsky-Malevitch ("Sophie" in the 1997 animated film), the Dowager Empress's lady-in-waiting with whom he had an affair ("We'll Go From There"). Count Ipolitov is fatally shot by the police for illegally boarding the train. The police officers then go after Anya, Dmitry, and Vlad since they are wanted criminals in Russia, but they all jump off the train, narrowly avoiding capture.

As they travel across Russia by foot, Gleb receives orders to follow Anya and kill her if she is the real Anastasia ("Traveling Sequence"). Gleb agrees to the task, but he realizes that he is in love with Anya and questions his heart ("Still"). Anya, Vlad, and Dmitry finally arrive in France, and as they travel to Paris, Anya summons the courage to continue on with the hope that she will finally discover who she is ("Journey to the Past").

Act II
Anya, Vlad, and Dmitry arrive in Paris and are swept up by the sights and sounds of the city ("Paris Holds the Key (to Your Heart)"). When Vlad and Dmitry go off on their own, Anya visits the Pont Alexandre III bridge, named after Anastasia's grandfather, and she feels a strong connection to it ("Crossing a Bridge").

Now a bitter, elderly woman, Dowager Empress Marie Feodorovna reads the letters of various Anastasia impersonators and, heartbroken, gives up hope of finding Anastasia ("Close the Door"). As Gleb arrives in Paris, Lily parties at the Neva Club, where rich and noble Russians exiles reminisce about the old Russia ("Land of Yesterday"). Lily is reunited with Vlad, with whom she is angry for stealing her jewelry when they were lovers. The two rekindle their scandalous romance and Vlad convinces her to let Anya meet the Dowager Empress at the ballet the next week ("The Countess and the Common Man"). However, Vlad accidentally drops the ballet tickets and Gleb, overhearing their plans, picks up their tickets ("Land of Yesterday Reprise").

At the hotel, Anya has a nightmare about the execution of the Romanovs ("A Nightmare"). Dmitry comforts her and recounts a story of how he bowed to Anastasia at a parade as a young boy. Anya vividly remembers this, and the two realize that Anya is indeed the Grand Duchess Anastasia ("In a Crowd of Thousands").

At the ballet, Vlad suspects that Anya and Dmitry are falling in love and is heartbroken on their behalf that the two can never be together ("Meant to Be"). During the performance of Swan Lake, Anya sees the Dowager Empress and remembers her. The Dowager Empress also sees Anya and recognizes her, but clings to denial. Dmitry and Gleb (who is conflicted about whether or not to shoot Anya) reflect on their romantic feelings ("Quartet at the Ballet").

After the ballet, Lily also recognizes Anya as Anastasia and immediately takes her to the Dowager Empress. Dmitry is anxious about the meeting and realizes that he is in love with Anya, but knows he must let her go to her family ("Everything to Win"). Anya leaves the meeting enraged, having learned from the Dowager Empress that Vlad and Dmitry intended to use her in their scheme for money. As she storms off, Dmitry waits for the Dowager Empress. Marie coldly dismisses him, but Dmitry disrespectfully stops her. He begs her to see Anya, but she refuses again.

Back at their hotel, Anya starts her packing, but she is interrupted by the Dowager Empress who, impressed by Dmitry's courage, has come to give her an opportunity. Anya is shocked by the Dowager Empress's cruelty, asserting that she isn't the nana that Anya remembered. The Dowager Empress angrily questions Anya about her past and the Romanov family, but Anya compels her to reflect on the person she has become over last two decades. Anya suddenly remembers the night that the Dowager Empress left her for Paris. When Anya produces the music box and sings the lullaby, the Dowager Empress finally realizes that Anya really is Anastasia and the two embrace, now reunited after twenty years ("Once Upon a December Reprise").

A press conference is held the next morning, where Vlad and Lily try to fend off the hungry reporters ("The Press Conference"). Before appearing in public, the Dowager Empress tells Anya that Dmitry did not take the reward after all and reveals her respect for him. Anya expresses misgivings about her future life as a princess and the Dowager Empress insists that no matter what she chooses, they'll always be together. Anya runs off to think; she realizes that she is in love with Dmitry, and decides that she must go after him ("Everything to Win Reprise"). As she turns to leave, Anya sees that Gleb has slipped in and locked them in the room. She realizes why he is there and Gleb says that he must kill her to complete his father's mission. Anya now clearly remembers the day her family was killed and, without fear, taunts him to kill her so that she can be with her family. Overcome with emotion and not willing to bear the shame of his father, Gleb is unable to kill Anya ("Still/The Neva Flows Reprise"). Anya comforts Gleb and they call a truce.

Vlad, Lily, and the palace staff search for Anya and the Dowager Empress is joyful, knowing that Anya is now where she belongs. She and Gleb announce to their people that the rumors of Anastasia will now cease; the reward for finding her will be donated to charity. Anya discovers Dmitry at Pont Alexandre III, where they embrace. The couple leaves Paris as the spirits of the Romanovs celebrate the life that Anya and Dmitry will have together ("Finale").

Musical numbers
Titles of songs which appeared in the original 1997 animated film are in bold.
Renamed from the Hartford production (#)
Not featured in the cast recordings (+)
Features the melody of "In the Dark of the Night", the cut song from the film (±)
Replaced by a reprise of "Paris Holds the Key (To Your Heart)" in the US tour and international productions (∞)

 Act I
Saint Petersburg, 1907, 1917, and 1927
 "Prologue: Once Upon a December" – Dowager Empress and Little Anastasia
 "The Last Dance of the Romanovs" – Ensemble #+
 "A Rumor in St. Petersburg" – Dmitry, Vlad and Ensemble
 "In My Dreams" – Anya
 "The Rumors Never End" – Gleb and Ensemble +
 "Learn to Do It" – Vlad, Anya, and Dmitry
 "The Neva Flows" – Gleb #
 "The Neva Flows (Reprise)" – Men +
 "My Petersburg" – Dmitry and Anya
 "Once Upon a December" – Anya and Ensemble
 "A Secret She Kept" – Anya # +
 "Stay, I Pray You" – Count Ipolitov, Anya, Dmitry, Vlad, and Ensemble ±
 "We'll Go From There" – Vlad, Anya, Dmitry, and Ensemble
 "Traveling Sequence" – Gleb, Gorlinsky, Anya, Dmitry, and Vlad +
 "Still" – Gleb
 "Journey to the Past" – Anya

 Act II
Paris, 1927
 "Paris Holds the Key (To Your Heart)" – Vlad, Dmitry, Anya and Ensemble
 "Crossing a Bridge" – Anya ∞
 "Close the Door" – Dowager Empress
 "Land of Yesterday" – Lily and Ensemble
 "The Countess and the Common Man" – Vlad and Lily
 "Land of Yesterday (Reprise)" – Gleb +
 "A Nightmare" – Romanov Children, Tsar and Tsarina +
 "In a Crowd of Thousands" – Dmitry and Anya
 "Meant to Be" – Vlad #
 "Quartet at the Ballet" – Anya, Dmitry, Dowager Empress, and Gleb
 "Everything to Win" – Dmitry
 "Once Upon a December (Reprise)" – Anya and Dowager Empress
 "The Press Conference" – Lily, Vlad, and Ensemble
 "Everything to Win (Reprise)" – Anya
 "Still/The Neva Flows (Reprise)" – Gleb and Ensemble #
 "Finale" – Company

Main characters and casts

Notable Broadway cast replacements
 Max von Essen replaced Ramin Karimloo as Gleb on December 5, 2017.
 Vicki Lewis replaced Caroline O'Connor as Countess Lily on March 27, 2018.
 Judy Kaye replaced Mary Beth Peil as Dowager Empress on September 28, 2018.
 Cody Simpson replaced Zach Adkins as Dmitry on November 29, 2018.
 Penny Fuller replaced Judy Kaye as Dowager Empress on January 7, 2019.

Critical response
The Broadway production was met with mixed to positive reviews. The Hollywood Reporter reviewer, David Rooney, wrote: "The seamlessness and storytelling economy of that opening sequence is quite impressive, deftly handling the ambiguity surrounding Anastasia's fate, while her family is murdered by revolutionaries. But the long first act gets bogged down, and while Ahrens and Flaherty certainly know how to craft a narrative-driven song, the music is more often serviceable than inspired. McNally's book dutifully follows the Disney-princess model... The second act picks up considerably with the 1927 move to Paris..."

Ben Brantley, reviewing for The New York Times, wrote: "The show in which she [Christy Altomare] appears trembles nonstop with internal conflicts during its drawn-out two-and-a-half hours. Part of the source of its malaise may be detected in a conspicuous credit below the title in the program that reads, 'Inspired by the 20th Century Fox motion pictures' .... Anastasia may well tap into the dewy-eyed demographic that made Wicked such an indestructible favorite of female adolescents. Those without such nostalgic insulation are likely to find this Anastasia a chore... bloody periods of history, like the Russian Revolution, do not naturally lend themselves to perky song and dance".

Awards and honors

2016 Hartford Stage production

2017 Broadway production

References

External links
 Internet Broadway Database
 Official Site

2016 musicals
Anastasia (franchise)
Broadway musicals
Musicals based on animated films
Musicals by Lynn Ahrens
Musicals by Stephen Flaherty
Musicals by Terrence McNally
Plays set in Russia
Plays set in the 1900s
Plays set in the Russian Empire
Plays based on real people
Cultural depictions of Grand Duchess Anastasia Nikolaevna of Russia